John Richardson  (1817–1904) was an Anglican priest: he was the Archdeacon of Southwark from 1882 until  his death on 19 March 1904.

Richardson was educated at Trinity College, Dublin and ordained in 1843. Following a curacy at Haslingden he held incumbencies in Musbury, Milnsbridge, Manchester and Bury St Edmunds before becoming Vicar of Camden Church, Camberwell in 1874.

References

1817 births
Alumni of Trinity College Dublin
Archdeacons of Southwark
1904 deaths